The 1950 San Francisco 49ers season was the franchise's 1st season in the National Football League and their 5th overall. After playing the previous four years in the All-America Football Conference (AAFC), which folded after the 1949 season, the 49ers, Baltimore Colts, and Cleveland Browns all joined the NFL from the AAFC.

San Francisco's first NFL game was at Kezar Stadium on September 17 against the New York Yanks, as the 49ers fell short, losing by a score of 21–17. They started the season 0–5 before recording their first NFL victory in a 28–27 win over the Detroit Lions at home. The Niners played better after the 0–5 start, went 3–4 in their remaining 7 games to finish the season 3–9, and failed to qualify for the playoffs.

Quarterback Frankie Albert completed 50.7% of his passes, while throwing for 14 touchdowns and 23 interceptions. Running back Joe Perry rushed for a team-high 647 yards and 5 touchdowns, while wide receiver Alyn Beals caught 22 passes for 315 yards, and 3 touchdowns.

Offseason

NFL Draft

Even though the former AAFC teams drafted after all of the NFL teams in each round, the Niners grabbed future Hall of Famer Leo Nomellini in the first round.

Regular season

Schedule

Game summaries

Week 1: vs. New York Yanks

Week 2: vs. Chicago Bears

Week 3: vs. Los Angeles Rams

Week 4: at Detroit Lions

Week 5: at New York Yanks

Week 6: vs. Detroit Lions

Week 7: vs. Baltimore Colts

Week 8: at Los Angeles Rams

Week 9: at Cleveland Browns

Week 10: at Chicago Bears

Week 11: at Green Bay Packers

Week 13: vs. Green Bay Packers

Standings

Pro Bowl
San Francisco's players selected for the Pro Bowl:

References

External links
1950 49ers on Pro Football Reference
SHRP Sports

San Francisco 49ers seasons
San Francisco 49ers